The men's 800 metres race was the second-longest of the four flat-track events on the Athletics at the 1896 Summer Olympics programme. The preliminary heats were the third event held on 6 April. The nine competitors were split into two groups. The top two athletes in each heat advanced to the final, which was held on 9 April.

Background

This was the first appearance of the event, which is one of 12 athletics events to have been held at every Summer Olympics. The unofficial world record holder, Charles Kilpatrick of the United States, did not compete in Athens. Edwin Flack of Australia was the favorite among those who competed.

Competition format

The competition consisted of two rounds, heats and a final. There were two heats, scheduled to have 7 runners each. The top two runners in each heat advanced to the final.

The track was 330 metres in circumference (unlike modern tracks which are 400 metres), so the race was more than two laps. The track had very sharp turns and was made of loose cinders, making running difficult. Runners turned clockwise rather than the current counterclockwise turns.

Records

Edwin Flack set the initial Olympic record of 2:10.0 in the first heat; that time was not beaten in the second heat or the final.

Schedule

The precise times of the events are not recorded. For the first round, the heats were the third event of the day on Monday. The final was held during the afternoon session on Thursday, which began at 2:30 p.m.; it was the first event of the session.

Results

Semifinals 

The two heats of the preliminary round were held on 6 April. The top two runners in each heat advanced.

Semifinal 1

Flack beat Dáni by four feet with the others far behind; his time of 2:10.0 was the inaugural Olympic record.

Semifinal 2

Lermusiaux beat Golemis by 1¼ yards.

Final

The final consisted of only three runners, as Lermusiaux elected not to compete to save himself for the marathon. Flack won by five meters, and Dáni finished 95 yards ahead of Golemis.

Results summary

References

  (Digitally available at la84foundation.org)
  (Excerpt available at la84foundation.org)
 

Men's 0800 metres
800 metres at the Olympics